Reflectance paper is a surface that contains a lattice of mirrored dimples. The paper is printed with color and the angle-dependent reflectance function for each pixel of an image captured with a light field camera such as a Lytro. The image then displays differently depending on the angle of incident light in the viewing environment. This technique can be used for example to display the image of a sculpture with its direction-dependent shadow depending on the angle of the light.

History

As of 2012, researchers at the University of California, Santa Cruz, Hewlett-Packard Laboratories and 3M had created the first type of this kind of paper, using a hexagonal lattice of millimeter-sized dimples. Dimple depth was 50 µm, representing 70% of a hemisphere.  Mirroring used silver or sputtered aluminum. A 32×32 matrix of light-field information was printed on a transparent mask over the dimples.

Notes

Digital photography
Science of photography
Optical materials